Spotted Elk (Lakota:  Uŋpȟáŋ Glešká, sometimes spelled OH-PONG-GE-LE-SKAH or Hupah Glešká:  1826  – ), was a chief of the Miniconjou, Lakota Sioux. He was a son of Miniconjou chief Lone Horn and became a chief upon his father's death. He was a highly renowned chief with skills in war and negotiations.

In 1890, he was killed by the U.S. Army at  Creek, Pine Ridge Indian Reservation  Wazí Aháŋhaŋ Oyáŋke), South Dakota, USA with at least 150 members of his tribe, in what became known as the Wounded Knee Massacre.

Early life
Spotted Elk (Lakota: Uŋpȟáŋ Glešká) was born about 1826, the son of Lakota Sioux chief Lone Horn (Heh-won-ge-chat).  His family belonged to the Miniconjou ("Planters by the River") subgroup of the Teton Lakota (Sioux). In 1877, Spotted Elk became the chief of his tribe upon his father's death at the age of 87.

Chief Spotted Elk

Skillful diplomat
As chief, Spotted Elk (who later became known by the name of 'Big Foot' or Sitȟáŋka), was considered a great man of peace.  He was best known among his people for his political and diplomatic successes.  He was skilled at settling mass quarrels and was often in great demand among other Teton bands.

Sitting Bull and Crazy Horse alliance
During the 1870s, Spotted Elk and his brother Touch the Clouds (Lakota:Maȟpíya Ičáȟtagya) allied their bands against the US Army, together with Sitting Bull (Lakota: Tȟatȟáŋka Íyotake) and Crazy Horse (Lakota:Tȟašúŋke Witkó) .  Spotted Elk saw no major action during the Great Sioux War of 1876-77.  However, his tribe – the Miniconjou, Lakota Sioux – suffered during the war, after which they surrendered.

Reservation placement
Following the Sioux Wars, the government placed the Miniconjou on the Cheyenne River Indian Reservation, South Dakota.  Spotted Elk encouraged adaptation to reservation life, by way of developing sustainable agriculture and building schools for Lakota children.  He was amongst the first American Indians to raise corn in accordance with government standards.  Spotted Elk also advocated a peaceful attitude toward white settlers.

Ghost Dance conversion and evangelism

New religious movement
Due to poor living conditions on the reservations, the Lakota struggled greatly to survive.  In some cases, Indian agents were corrupt,  undertaking fraud and stealing Lakota supplies/annuities.  By 1889 they were in despair, and looked for change.

The radical solution came in the form of the Ghost Dance movement, a new religion initiated by Paiute prophet Wovoka.  Spotted Elk and the Lakota became among the most enthusiastic believers in the 'Ghost Dance' ceremony when it arrived among them, in the spring of 1890.  Although governmental reservation rules outlawed the practice of the religion, the movement swept like a wildfire through the camps and local Indian agents reacted with alarm.  Some agents successfully suppressed the dancers, while others called for federal troops to restore order.

Chief Red Cloud offers refuge
After , when Sitting Bull was killed on Standing Rock Reservation, his followers fled for refuge at the camp of his former-ally and half-brother, Chief Spotted Elk.  Fearing arrest and government reprisals against his band, Spotted Elk led his band south to the Pine Ridge Reservation, South Dakota, at the invitation of Chief Red Cloud (Lakota: Maȟpíya Lúta).  Red Cloud hoped that his fellow chief could help make peace.  Seeking safety, flying a white flag and with no intention of fighting, Spotted Elk contracted pneumonia on the journey to Pine Ridge.

Death at Wounded Knee Massacre

Peaceful surrender
On December 28, 1890, Maj. Samuel M. Whitside's battalion of the 7th Cavalry intercepted the Lakota. Ill with pneumonia, Spotted Elk surrendered peacefully, with his band; the cavalry took them into custody, escorting them to a campsite near Wounded Knee Creek, Pine Ridge, where they were to set camp. The site was already established with a store and several log houses.

Wounded Knee Massacre

The night before the massacre, Col. James W. Forsyth arrived at Wounded Knee Creek and ordered his men to position four Hotchkiss cannons around the area in which the Lakota had been forced to camp.

On the morning of December 29, 1890, Forsyth's soldiers entered the camp and demanded that the Lakota give up their weapons. In the ensuing confrontation, a firearm was discharged. It was later believed to have been by a deaf man, Black Coyote, who presumably did not hear the command to put down his rifle. A large gun fight quickly ensued. The US forces killed more than 250 Lakota, mostly non-combatants (women and children) and Spotted Elk was among those killed.

Notes

References
 Michno, Gregory. Lakota Noon: The Indian Narrative of Custer's Defeat. Missoula, MT: Mountain Press Publishing Company, 1997. .

External links
U-s-history.com, Lakota Chief Big Foot
Indigenouspeople.net, Lakota Chief Big Foot
Lastoftheindependents.com, Lakota Chief Big Foot and the Ghost Dance

1826 births
1890 deaths
1890 crimes in the United States
Native American people of the Indian Wars
Murdered Native American people
Big Foot (chief)
Lakota leaders
People murdered in South Dakota
Deaths by firearm in South Dakota
Miniconjou people
19th-century Native Americans